Jaan Teemant's first cabinet was in office in Estonia from 15 December 1925 to 23 July 1926, when it was succeeded by Jüri Teemant's second cabinet.

Members

This cabinet's members were the following:

References

Cabinets of Estonia